Charles James Ambler (13 August 1868 – 5 September 1952), born Charles James Toby, was an English footballer who played as a goalkeeper. He made a single appearance in the Football League for Royal Arsenal and had two spells at Tottenham Hotspur, making 20 Southern League appearances in his second spell. He also played, mainly as a reserve team player, for West Ham United, where he made two first team appearances, and later with Millwall.

Life and career

Born in Alverstoke, Hampshire, Ambler began his career at Bostall Rovers before signing as a professional with Royal Arsenal (soon after renamed Woolwich Arsenal) in 1891. He returned to the amateur ranks the following season, which, while nominally being registered as an Arsenal player, enabled him to play for a variety of clubs with no fixed tenure at any of them. In the period of 1891 to 1894, as well as playing in friendlies for Arsenal, he also played for Clapton, Dartford and Luton Town.

In October 1894, he was formally transferred to Tottenham Hotspur and made his debut in an FA Cup second qualifying round match against Wolverton on 3 November 1894. Spurs, at that point, were not competing in an organised league, which meant that Ambler could also play elsewhere. In October 1894, Ambler signed Southern League forms with Luton Town, but did not register an appearance before he then signed Football League forms with Woolwich Arsenal the following month. There, he made one Second Division appearance, against Newton Heath on 30 November 1895. Ambler had been selected due to the suspension of first-choice 'keeper Harry Storer. Arsenal lost the match 5–1. With no other league appearances to his name, he left Arsenal in the summer of 1896 and returned to Tottenham Hotspur.

Ambler was registered with Spurs from 1896 until 1900. His second spell saw Ambler make 22 Southern League appearances for the club, missing just one match of the 1896–97 season. In total, in both his spells at Tottenham, he made 132 first team appearances. He had spells at Gravesend and New Brompton before, in 1901, he joined east London club West Ham United. Used as a reserve, he played just two first team games for the club in November 1901. The first came as a result of a clash of fixtures, with the Irons due to play a Southern League game against Spurs on the same day as hosting Leyton in the FA Cup. The club chose to field its regulars for the league game and concede home advantage for the cup; the first team lost 1–0 while the second side, with Ambler in goal, won by the same scoreline. Thus, Ambler got his chance in the following Southern League game, against Queens Park Rangers, but with the game ending in a 2–1 defeat, this was to be his only appearance in the league.

He went on to play for Millwall after leaving the Irons in the summer of 1902 and made two Southern League appearances that season. In later life, he went back to using his birth name. He died in 1952.

Career statistics

Notes

References

1868 births
1952 deaths
People from Gosport
Footballers from Hampshire
English footballers
Association football goalkeepers
Arsenal F.C. players
Clapton F.C. players
Dartford F.C. players
Luton Town F.C. players
Tottenham Hotspur F.C. players
Gravesend United F.C. players
Gillingham F.C. players
West Ham United F.C. players
Millwall F.C. players
English Football League players
Southern Football League players